Giesecke may refer to:

People:
Heinz-Eberhard Giesecke (1913–1991), German historian
Karl Ludwig Giesecke FRSE (1761–1833), German actor, librettist, polar explorer and mineralogist
Markus Giesecke (born 1979), German futsal player from Regensburg

Businesses:
Giesecke & Devrient (G&D), German company that prints banknotes and securities, smart cards, etc.
Schelter & Giesecke Type Foundry, German type foundry & manufacturer of printing presses started in 1819 in Leipzig

Geography:
Giesecke Glacier, a glacier in Avannaata municipality in northwestern Greenland
Giesecke Isfjord, a fjord in Avannaata municipality in northwestern Greenland

See also
Geseke
Giese
Giske